Walter de la Wyle was Bishop of Salisbury from 1263 to 1271, and the founder of St. Edmund's College, Salisbury.

Biography

De la Wyle began his career as a chaplain to Robert de Bingham, which led to his appointment as warden of a bridge over the Avon connected with St. John's Hospital. Eventually Walter de la Wyle was elected succentor of Salisbury, one of the chief officers of a cathedral chapter, with responsibility for overseeing religious ritual in cathedral worship services. This was an especially prestigious position in Salisbury since the Sarum Rite, the order of service used at Salisbury Cathedral, was quickly becoming the most popular order of service in England. It was from the office of Succentor that Walter de la Wyle was elevated to the office of bishop on 29 January 1263 as the successor to Bishop Giles of Bridport.  He was consecrated on 27 May 1263.

In 1269, he founded St Edmund's college, and at or around the same time a new parish of St. Edmund's was created to serve the growing population of Salisbury.

De la Wyle died on 3 or 4 January 1271.

Citations

Sources

Bishops of Salisbury
13th-century English Roman Catholic bishops
1271 deaths
Year of birth unknown